is a Japanese sprinter. He competed in the 4 × 100 metres relay event at the 2015 World Championships in Athletics in Beijing, China.

International competition

References

External links

Takuya Nagata at Fujitsu Track & Field Team 

1994 births
Living people
Japanese male sprinters
Sportspeople from Aichi Prefecture
World Athletics Championships athletes for Japan
Universiade medalists in athletics (track and field)
Place of birth missing (living people)
Universiade gold medalists for Japan
Medalists at the 2015 Summer Universiade
21st-century Japanese people